Cascade Mountain is in Essex County of New York.  It is one of the 46 Adirondack High Peaks (36th) and is located in the Adirondack Park. Its name comes from a series of waterfalls on a brook near the mountain's base. The lake it flows into and the pass between Cascade and Pitchoff mountains are also named Cascade.

Cascade Mountain towers over the Van Hoevenberg ski center, the venue for bobsledding at the 1980 Winter Olympics.

Of the 46 Adirondack High Peaks, Cascade is the most accessible and the most frequently climbed. The main trailhead is on Route 73, 6 miles (10 km) east of Lake Placid, at Cascade Pass, overlooking Cascade Lake. The summit is visible from the trailhead, a rare occurrence in the High Peaks.

The well-used trail follows red plastic markers and takes the hiker up 2.2 miles (4.6 km) and almost 2,000 vertical feet (600 vertical m) to the mountain's bare-rock summit, which, while it resembles the alpine summits found on many higher peaks, is instead the result of a 1903 fire.

Views are possible in all directions, and on a clear day with good weather one often finds many hikers on the summit.

Porter Mountain, another of the High Peaks, is an easy side-trip.  The summit of Porter Mountains is 0.7 miles from Cascade Mountain Trail.  The two summits can be reached together on a 6.2-mile hike.

Gallery

Notes

External links 
 
 
 
 360 degree interactive panorama
 Cascades Mountain - letsgoplayoutside.com

Mountains of Essex County, New York
Tourist attractions in Essex County, New York
Mountains of New York (state)